Pseudagaone is a genus of beetles in the family Cerambycidae, containing the following species:

 Pseudagaone cerdai Tavakilian & Penaherrera-Leiva, 2007
 Pseudagaone suturafissa Tippmann, 1960

References

Rhinotragini